Jaran Manophet (Thai: จรัล มโนเพ็ชร; 1 January 1951 – 4 September 2001) was a folk-singer of Northern Thailand. Born in Chiang Mai city, he composed and performed around 300 songs, some in Northern Thai (Lanna) language and some in Central Thai. He is credited with being a pioneer in connecting traditional Lanna folksong with Western popular music styles that became widely appreciated in Thailand in the 1970s. His songs were stylistically simple but appealing; his lyrics brought local experiences of social and economic change into national circulation.

On 1 January 2022 a memorial sculpture to Jaran Manophet was inaugurated in Buak Haad public park, inside the old city wall of Chiang Mai and near to his birthplace.

References

External links 
 "Jaran Manopet - Topic" on YouTube (videos may contain ads)

1951 births
2001 deaths
Jaran Manophet
Jaran Manophet
Jaran Manophet